Hot Wheels is  a thirty-minute Saturday-morning cartoon series broadcast on ABC from 1969 to 1971, under the primary sponsorship of Mattel Toys. The show took pains to stress that it was "pro-safety", contrasting the safe and responsible behavior of the series' racing-club protagonists with the reckless behavior of their rivals.

The show was criticized by the FCC, which considered it a half-hour commercial for toy cars. ABC contested the charge, saying that there was no prior commitment to Mattel, and that Hot Wheels cars were never advertised during the program. The network was backed up by the National Association of Broadcasters, and the show remained on the ABC schedule for two seasons.

Synopsis
The series mainly focused on the racing exploits of a high school student, Jack "Rabbit" Wheeler, who led the Hot Wheels Racing Club.

Voice cast
 Bob Arbogast as Doc Warren
 Melinda Casey as Janet Martin
 Albert Brooks as Kip Chogi
  Susan Davis as Ardeth Pratt
 Casey Kasem as Dexter Carter
 Nora Marlowe as Mother O'Hare
 Michael Rye as Jack "Rabbit" Wheeler

Episodes
Sky Sailor

The Funny Money Caper

Surf's Up

The Winner

The Hot Head

Big Race

The Family Car

Fire Fighters

The Jewel

Fake Out - Stake Out

The Buggy Ride

Four Wheel Time Bomb

Hit and Run

It Takes a Team

Ardeth the Demon (Ardeth the Highwayman)

Like Father, Like Son

Avalanche Country

Danger Around the Clock

Tough Cop

Hotter Than the Devils

Underground

Rough Ride (The Test)

Race to Space

Monkey a-Okay

Diamonds Are a Girls Worst Friend

Big Heart, Little Hearts

Get Back on That Horse

Hitchhike to Danger

Dragon's Tooth Peak

The Doc Warren Trophy Race

Show-Off

Drag Strip

Mata Hari Ardeth

Slicker-Slicks

FCC action
Some time during the show's broadcast, the Federal Communications Commission (FCC) received complaints from toy companies who argued that it was actually a thirty-minute commercial for the toys; one of them was Topper Toys, a rival to Mattel. The FCC obliged by ordering stations to log part of the airings as advertising time.

Home media
The show was available on DVD in 2023.

International broadcast

See also
 Hot Wheels (1969-1971)
 Heroes on Hot Wheels (1991-1992)
 Hot Wheels: World Race (2003)
 Hot Wheels: AcceleRacers (2005-2006)
 Hot Wheels Battle Force 5 (2009-2011)
 Team Hot Wheels (2014-2017)

References

External links

American Broadcasting Company original programming
1969 American television series debuts
1971 American television series endings
1960s American animated television series
1970s American animated television series
American children's animated action television series
American children's animated adventure television series
American children's animated sports television series
Animated television series about auto racing
English-language television shows
Hot Wheels
Jetix original programming
Television series by CBS Studios
Television shows based on Mattel toys